Axayacatl  and its plural, l  (the plural form is not commonly used in daily Nahuatl) are the two common names of pre-Hispanic origin used in Mexico to refer to species of aquatic insects in the family Corixidae, the eggs of which, ahuauhtli (in Spanish ), deposited abundantly on rushes (grass-like plants in the Juncaceae family) and flags (species of Iris plant) in lakes and ponds, are collected and sold as a sort of Mexican caviar, as part of Aztec cuisine.

Gastronomy use
Both the adult axayácatl and its roe are edible. Both foods are very rich in protein, with digestible protein percentages of 61.96 and 63.88 percent, respectively.

The accounts of the Spanish conquistadors tell that they were given as an offering to the divinity Xiuhtecutli. They were also brought to Montezuma's court in Tenochtitlan (in Nahuatl, Tenochtitlan, i.e., with a grave accent) daily, so that the Aztec Emperor could eat them fresh for breakfast.

They are most consumed during Lent and Christmas Eve. Cultivation of these species is simple and cheap, although they fetch high prices in the market due to high demand. In addition, they are endangered by the drying and pollution of the lakes in which they have their habitat.

Notes

References

External links
 Julieta Ramos-Elorduy, “Threatened edible insects in Hidalgo, Mexico and some measures to preserve them.” Journal of Ethnobiology and Ethnomedicine, 4 December 2006.

Mexican cuisine
Insects as food
Corixidae
Insects of Mexico